Vracovice is a municipality and village in Benešov District in the Central Bohemian Region of the Czech Republic. It has about 400 inhabitants.

Administrative parts
The village of Malovidy is an administrative part of Vracovice.

References

Villages in Benešov District